The following is a list of people who served in the United States Marine Corps and have gained fame through previous or subsequent endeavors, infamy, or successes. Marines who became notable in the United States Marine Corps and are part of the Marine Corps history and lore are listed and posted in the list of historically notable United States Marines.

A
 
 Joseph M. Acaba – NASA astronaut
 Don Adams – Emmy Award-winning actor (Get Smart)
 Eddie Adams – Pulitzer Prize-winning photographer
 Sandy Alderson – General Manager of the New York Mets
 Andrew M. Allen – NASA astronaut
 Art Anderson – NFL football player
 Mike Anderson – NFL football player
 Walter Anderson – author; PARADE editor; Parade Publications CEO; GED spokesperson
 Paul Arizin – NBA basketball player
 Bea Arthur – actor (Maude, The Golden Girls); she denied her service in the USMC in later life

B

 F. Lee Bailey – lawyer, notable for his involvement in cases relating to the My Lai Massacre and the O.J. Simpson trial
 Dusty Baker – Major League Baseball manager for the San Francisco Giants
 James Baker – former U.S. Secretary of State, elder statesman, advisor and friend of the Bush family
 Leslie M. "Bud" Baker, Jr. – chairman of the Board of Wachovia Bank
 Greg Ballard – Mayor of Indianapolis
 Nick Barone – boxer (1950s), the "Fighting Marine"
 Thomas D. Barr – attorney with Cravath, Swaine & Moore, "father of modern big-case litigation"
 James Lee Barrett – Tony Award-winning writer (Shenandoah)
 Carmen Basilio – world champion boxer, Boxing Hall of Famer
 Hank Bauer – professional baseball player
 Jim Beaver – actor, writer, star of Deadwood and Supernatural
 John Beckett – college football star and coach
 Bob Bell – Bozo the Clown (TV)
 Glen Bell – founder of Taco Bell fast food chain
 Terrel Bell – U.S. Secretary of Education (1981–1984) during the Reagan administration
 Donald P. Bellisario – television producer and screenwriter of Magnum, P.I., JAG, and NCIS
 Henry Bellmon  – Governor of Oklahoma, U.S. Senator (OK-R)
 John Besh – chef and restaurant owner
 Patty Berg – LPGA golfer
 Rod Bernard – swamp pop musician
 Charles F. Bolden, Jr. – NASA shuttle pilot and administrator
 Robert Bork – retired federal judge, law professor and Supreme court nominee
 Blackbear Bosin – artist
 Harold Bradley Jr.  – football player, International artist, actor and musician
 Hugh Brannum – "Mr. Green Jeans" on Captain Kangaroo
 Donald Bren  – CEO, The Irvine Company
 Randolph Bresnik – NASA astronaut, Space Shuttle Crew STS-129, and ISS Flight Engineer/Commander 52/53
 Daniel B. Brewster – U.S. Senator from Maryland
 Art Buchwald – humor columnist
 
 Dale Bumpers – Governor of Arkansas, U.S. Senator from Arkansas
 Lem Burnham – American football player
 Romus R.V. Burgin – Author of Islands of the Damned: A Marine at War in the Pacific who was portrayed in the HBO miniseries The Pacific (2010)
 Bob Burns – comedian
 Conrad Burns – U.S. Senator from Montana

C

 Robert D. Cabana – NASA space shuttle astronaut, director of Stennis and Kennedy Space Centers
 Enrique Camarena – Mexican-American DEA agent murdered in 1985
 Philip Caputo – author, journalist
 Rod Carew – baseball Hall of Famer
 Drew Carey – comedian, actor, host of The Price Is Right (2007 – present)
 Gerald P. Carr – NASA astronaut
 James Carville – political strategist and manager
 Francis H. Case – represented South Dakota in the U.S. House of Representatives (1937–1950) and the U.S. Senate (1951–1962)
 Ronald D. Castille – Chief Justice of the Supreme Court of Pennsylvania
 John Chafee – Governor of Rhode Island, Secretary of the Navy, U. S. Senator (R-RI)
 Roberto Clemente – baseball Hall of Famer
 Stephen Cochran – country music singer and songwriter
 Mike Coffman – U.S. Congressman representing Colorado
 Eddie Collins – baseball Hall of Famer
 Jerry Coleman – baseball player, announcer
 Charles Colson – White House special counsel, Nixon staffer (Watergate), evangelist
 Charlie Conerly – pro football player and College Football Hall of Fame inductee
 Gene L. Coon – writer, Star Trek; Coon also wrote under the pseudonym Lee Cronin.
 Courtney Ryley Cooper – writer
 Barry Corbin – actor (WarGames)"Northern Exposure"
 Jon Corzine – former Governor of New Jersey and U.S. Senator (D-NJ)
 Bill Cowan – hostage rescue expert, Fox News television commentator
 Josh Culbreath – 1956 Summer Olympics 400m hurdles bronze medalist, college track coach with 10 national championships, actor on the Cosby Show
 Walter Cunningham – Apollo 7 astronaut

D
 
 Jack Davis – American football player
 James Devereux – U.S. Congressman from Maryland
 Albert Diaz – 4th Circuit Court of Appeals Judge, first Hispanic judge to serve the Fourth Circuit Court of Appeals
 Richard Diebenkorn – artist
 Bradford Dillman – actor (Compulsion)
 David Dinkins – Mayor of New York City
 Vince Dooley – head football coach and athletic director of University of Georgia
 Art Donovan – football Hall of Famer
 Terry Downes – British former world middleweight champion boxer
 Paul Douglas – United States Senator and the oldest Marine recruit to have completed recruit training
 Buster Drayton – world champion boxer
 Adam Driver – Academy Award-nominated actor best known for playing Kylo Ren in the Star Wars sequel trilogy
 Andre Dubus – author
 Donald Roan Dunagan - Child actor best known for providing the voice of young Bambi in Bambi (1942), and also for portraying the young son of Baron Frankenstein in Son of Frankenstein (1939).
 David Douglas Duncan – photographer

 Dale Dye – actor, film industry military technical advisor and historian

E

 William A. Eddy – university professor and president, U.S. minister to Saudi Arabia (1943–1946)
 David Eigenberg – actor (Sex and the City)
 Ronald "R." Lee Ermey – actor (Full Metal Jacket), host of Mail Call and Lock N' Load with R. Lee Ermey
 Nicholas Estavillo – NYPD Chief of Patrol (Ret.); became in 2002 the first Puerto Rican and the first Hispanic in the history of the NYPD to reach the three-star rank of Chief of Patrol
 Don Everly – musician, member of Rock & Roll Hall of Fame
 Phil Everly – musician, member of Rock & Roll Hall of Fame

F
 
 Hussein Mohamed Farrah – son and successor of Somali warlord Mohamed Farrah Aidid
 Mike Farrell – actor (M*A*S*H)
 Freddie Fender – Tejano music recording artist
 Bob Ferguson – songwriter, record producer, and historian

 Jesse Ferguson – heavyweight boxer
 Nate Fick -- diplomat and technology entrepreneur
 Morris Fisher – five-time Olympic gold medalist for shooting
 Bill Fitch – basketball coach
 Shelby Foote – author, American Civil War historian
 Glenn Ford – actor (Gilda)
 Joe Foss – former Governor of South Dakota, first Commissioner of the AFL, former NRA President
 Rose Franco – Administrative Assistant to the Secretary of the Navy
 Orville Freeman – 29th Governor of Minnesota
 Hayden Fry – football coach, University of Iowa
 Mark Fuhrman – LAPD detective who became famous during the O.J. Simpson trial

G

 Bill Gallo  – cartoonist, journalist
 Christopher George – actor (The Rat Patrol)
 Merlin German – "Miracle Marine", founder of Merlin's Miracles
 Wayne Gilchrest – Republican U.S. Representative from Maryland
 John Glenn – astronaut, first American to orbit Earth, oldest man in space, U.S. Senator
 Scott Glenn – actor (The Right Stuff)
 Josh Gracin – country singer and American Idol contestant
 Calvin Graham – at age 12, Graham became the youngest U.S. serviceman to serve and fight in World War II. The TV movie Too Young the Hero was based on his life
 Clu Gulager – actor (The Return of the Living Dead)

H

 
 Gene Hackman – Academy Award-winning actor (The French Connection, Crimson Tide)
 Fred Haise – NASA astronaut (Apollo 13 and Space Shuttle Enterprise), who also served in the United States Air Force. Of the 24 men to have ever flown to the moon, Haise is the only Marine.
 Ahmard Hall – NFL football player
 Hugh W. Hardy – pioneer of the 3D seismic method
 Ernie Harwell – sports journalist and Detroit Tigers broadcaster
 Gustav Hasford – author of The Short-Timers (basis of movie Full Metal Jacket) and The Phantom Blooper
 Sterling Hayden – actor (Dr. Strangelove or: How I Learned to Stop Worrying and Love the Bomb)
 Bill Hayes – actor and recording artist who also served in the U.S. Navy (The Cardinal, "The Ballad of Davy Crockett")
 Louis Hayward – actor (The Saint in New York)
 Howell Heflin – U.S. Senator from Alabama
 Charles W. Henderson – author of books about Carlos Hathcock
 George Roy Hill – Academy Award-winning director of Butch Cassidy and the Sundance Kid and The Sting
 Jack W. Hill – Hill bears the distinction of holding Marine Corps enlisted service number one million (1,000,000).
 Elroy "Crazy Legs" Hirsch – football Hall of Famer
 Gil Hodges – professional baseball player
 Duncan D. Hunter – U.S. Congressman (California-R)
 Douglas G. Hurley – NASA astronaut

I
 Shannon Ihrke – Maxim super model who was featured on the cover of Maxim magazine.
 Paul Romanovsky Ilyinsky – Mayor of Palm Beach, Florida
 Don Imus – radio talk show host
Zach Iscol – entrepreneur, candidate in the 2021 New York City Comptroller election

J
 Keith Jackson – sportscaster
 Brian Girard James – TNA professional wrestler
 Bill Janklow – Governor of South Dakota, U.S. Congressman (R-SD)
 Jamey Johnson – country music artist
 Howard Johnson – American football player for the Green Bay Packers
 George Jones – country music artist

K

 Robert A. Katz – Academy Award-nominated film producer (Gettysburg, Selena, Introducing Dorothy Dandridge)
 Bob Keeshan  – Captain Kangaroo, original Clarabell the Clown on Howdy Doody
 Harvey Keitel – actor (Reservoir Dogs, Pulp Fiction)
 Brian Keith – actor (The Parent Trap)
 Greg Kelly – Fox News broadcast journalist, news reporter
 John F. Kelly – United States Secretary of Homeland Security
 Raymond W. Kelly – police commissioner of the City of New York
 Skip Kenney – U.S. Men's Olympic Swim Coach, Head Swim Coach at Stanford University
 Robert Kiyosaki – motivational speaker, author of Rich Dad, Poor Dad
 Russell Klika – U.S. military combat photographer, photojournalist, author of Iraq: Through the Eyes of an American Soldier
 Ron Kovic – author (Born on the Fourth of July)
 Ted Kulongoski – Governor of Oregon
 Bill Kurtis – television journalist, producer, narrator, and news anchor

L

 Mills Lane – boxing referee and TV's People's Court judge
 Dan Lauria – Television, stage, and film actor
 Eddie LeBaron – professional football player
 Robert Leckie – Author of over 40 American war history books who was later portrayed in the HBO miniseries The Pacific (2010)
 Jim Lehrer – journalist, host of PBS' The NewsHour with Jim Lehrer
 Alfred Lerner – financier, Chairman of MBNA Corporation
 Joe Lisi  – actor (Third Watch), retired NYPD Captain
 Clayton J. Lonetree – spied for Russia in the mid-1980s
 Tommy Loughran – world boxing champion
 Jack R. Lousma – NASA astronaut
 Robert A. Lutz – Vice Chairman of Global Product Development at General Motors Corporation
 Robert Ludlum – author (The Bourne Identity)
 William Lundigan – actor (Men into Space)
 Ted Lyons  – baseball Hall of Famer

M
 

 Jock Mahoney – actor, stuntman (Tarzan Goes to India, The Range Rider)
 William Manchester – author and historian
 Herman J. Mankiewicz – Oscar-winning screenwriter of Citizen Kane who also served in the United States Army Air Service
 Arman T. Manookian – artist of Hawaiian themes
 Mike Mansfield – U.S. Representative and Senator for Montana, Longest-serving Senate Majority Leader, U.S. Ambassador to Japan, co-author of the Douglas–Mansfield Bill (1951) supporting the U.S. Marine Corps.
 Karl Marlantes –  businessman, author of Matterhorn: A Novel of the Vietnam War
 Lee Marvin – Academy Award-winning actor (Cat Ballou)
 Robert F. Marx – pioneer scuba diver and author
 Carlo Mastrototaro – Mafia boss
 Al Matthews – actor and singer, he played Gunny Apone in the James Cameron film Aliens (1986)
 Tim Matheson- American Actor, star of Animal House and Fletch
 Bob Mathias – two-time Olympic champion in the decathlon, U.S. Congressman (California-R)
 James Mattis – United States Secretary of Defense
 Sam Mele, baseball player and manager
 Ronald Meyer – Vice Chairman of NBCUniversal, former president and Chief Operating Officer of Universal Studios
 Hugh McColl – former chairman and CEO of Bank of America
 Pete McCloskey – U.S. Congressman (California-R)
 Robert C. McFarlane – National Security Advisor to President Ronald Reagan; known for his role in Iran–Contra
 Tug McGraw – Major League relief pitcher and two-time World Series winner
 Paul F. McHale Jr. – U.S. Congressman from Pennsylvania (D), Assistant Secretary of Defense for Homeland Defense 
 Ed McMahon – television personality
 Walter Stauffer McIlhenny served as president of McIlhenny Company, maker of Tabasco brand pepper sauce.
 Sid McMath – Governor of Arkansas
 Steve McQueen – actor (Bullitt)
 William McMillan – Olympic gold medalist (1960), 25 meter rapid fire pistol
 Donald E. McQuinn – author of military and science fiction
 Zell Miller – Governor of Georgia, U.S. Senator (D)
 Billy Mills – Olympic gold medalist (1964), 10,000m run
 Tom Monaghan  – founder of Domino's Pizza
 Elizabeth Moon – award-winning fantasy and science fiction author
 Alvy Moore – actor (Green Acres)
 Paul Moore Jr. – 13th Bishop of New York
 Jim E. Mora – NFL head football coach
 Robert S. Mueller III – former director of the FBI (2001–2013)
 Blackjack Mulligan- aka Robert Windham retired professional wrestler
 Robert Mulligan – Academy Award-nominated filmmaker (To Kill a Mockingbird, Summer of '42)
 Jimmy Murray – former GM of Philadelphia Eagles and co-founder of Ronald McDonald House Charities
 John Murtha – U.S. Representative (D – PA)
 Franklin Story Musgrave – NASA astronaut
 Clay Myers – photographer (Pawprints of Katrina), animal welfare advocate
 Anton Myrer – author (Once an Eagle)

N
 Art Nalls – pilot/owner of an air show business starring his privately owned Harrier jump jet
 John Nelson – founder of SWAT.
 Oliver Nelson – jazz composer and musician
 Nick Newlin – rugby league player at the 2017 Rugby League World Cup
 Cody Nickson – television personality, winner of The Amazing Race 30, contestant of Big Brother 19
 Carlos I. Noriega – NASA astronaut
 Oliver North – Iran-Contra involvement, political commentator
 Ken Norton – world champion boxer, Boxing Hall of Famer

O
 Tom O'Brien – former NCAA head football coach, Boston College, NC State
 Gerald S. O'Loughlin – actor (The Rookies)
 Lee Harvey Oswald – accused assassin of U.S. President John F. Kennedy
 Hugh O'Brian – actor (The Life and Legend of Wyatt Earp)

P
 Ralph Parcaut – professional wrestler, Middleweight Champion of the World
 Fess Parker – Emmy-nominated film and TV actor
 Bob Parsons – founder and CEO of GoDaddy.com
 Sam Peckinpah – director of The Wild Bunch and Straw Dogs
 Paul Pender – Middleweight Boxing Champion
 George Peppard – actor (Breakfast at Tiffany's)
 Andy Phillip – Basketball Hall of Famer
 Bum Phillips – NFL head coach
 Charles Phillips – businessman, president of Oracle Corporation
 Sidney Phillips – author of You'll be Sor-ree, basis in part for Ken Burns' World War II documentary, The War (2007), and later portrayed in the HBO miniseries The Pacific (2010)
 Tony Poe – CIA paramilitary officer during the Vietnam War
 Charles Portis – author, best known for True Grit
 Lee Powell – actor (The Lone Ranger)
 Tyrone Power – actor (Alexander's Ragtime Band)
 Steven Pressfield – American author of historical fiction, non-fiction and screenplays including his 1995 novel The Legend of Bagger Vance and 2002 non-fiction book The War of Art
 Lewis Burwell Puller Jr. – Pulitzer Prize-winning author, son of Lewis "Chesty" Puller
 Artimus Pyle – Lynyrd Skynyrd drummer
 Joe Pyne – 1960s conservative talk show host

R

 C.J. Ramone (b. Christopher Joseph Ward) – musician, former member of The Ramones
 Lawrence G. Rawl – CEO of Exxon (1988–1993)
 Alex Raymond – cartoonist
 Donald Regan – U.S. Secretary of the Treasury, Chief of Staff (Reagan administration)
 Buddy Rich – jazz drummer
 Rudy Reyes (actor) – actor (Generation Kill) and martial arts instructor
 Rob Riggle – actor/comedian (The Daily Show with Jon Stewart)
 Scott Ritter – former United Nations arms inspector, intelligence officer, outspoken opponent of the Bush administration's foreign policy
 Charles S. "Chuck" Robb – Governor of Virginia, U.S. Senator, married to Linda Bird Johnson (daughter of President Lyndon Johnson)
 Pat Robertson – evangelist, social commentator
 James Roosevelt – U.S. Congressman (California); son of FDR, former Marine Raider
 Barney Ross – world champion boxer, Boxing Hall of Famer
 John Russell – actor (Lawman)
 Mark Russell – political satirist
 Robert Ryan – actor (The Wild Bunch, Crossfire)

S
  
 Tony Santiago – military historian
 Jim Sasser –  U.S. senator from Tennessee
 George Shultz – economist, U.S. Secretary of State, Secretary of Labor, Secretary of the Treasury
 George C. Scott – Academy Award-winning actor (Patton)
 Mike Scotti – author and producer of the documentary film Severe Clear
 Tom Seaver – baseball Hall of Famer
 Walter Seltzer – film producer (One-Eyed Jacks, The Omega Man, Soylent Green)
 Shaggy – musician and singer
 John Patrick Shanley – playwright, screenwriter, and director
 Bernard Shaw – CNN news anchor
 Mark Shields – journalist
 Alana Shipp – American/Israeli IFBB professional bodybuilder
 Scott Shriner – bass guitarist, member of Weezer
 Oliver Sipple – saved President Gerald Ford's life during an assassination attempt
 Otis Sistrunk – defensive tackle, Oakland Raiders, National Football League
 Eugene Sledge – author of With the Old Breed: At Peleliu and Okinawa, basis in part for Ken Burns' World War II documentary, The War (2007), and later portrayed in the HBO miniseries The Pacific (2010)
 Harold "Dutch" Smith – diver, representing the US in the Summer Olympics in 1928 and 1932 (1 gold, 1 silver medal)

 Frederick W. Smith – businessman, founder of FedEx
 W. Thomas Smith, Jr. – author, journalist
 John Philip Sousa – composer, conductor/orchestra leader
 Anthony Sowell  – Ohio serial murder suspect
 Thomas Sowell – economist, social commentator, and author
 Leon Spinks – world boxing champion
 Robert C. Springer – NASA astronaut.
 Scott H. Stalker – Command Senior Enlisted Leader of the United States Cyber Command, and the National Security Agency
 Laurence Stallings – playwright, screenwriter, literary critic, journalist, novelist and photographer best known for the 1924 play What Price Glory
 Brian Stann – World Extreme Cagefighting Light Heavyweight champion, Ultimate Fighting Championship fighter
 Ernie Stautner – NFL football player and coach
 Richard Steele – boxing referee
 Robert J. Stevens – Retired Chairman, President and chief executive officer of Lockheed Martin Corporation
 Tuffy Stone – chef and competitive barbecue master
 Eugene Stoner – designer of the AR-15 rifle, adopted by the US military as the M-16
 Frederick W. Sturckow – NASA astronaut and shuttle commander
 William Styron – Pulitzer Prize-winning author
 Arthur Ochs Sulzberger – publisher of The New York Times
 Charles R. "Chuck" Swindoll – evangelical Christian pastor, radio preacher
 Anthony Swofford – author of the memoir Jarhead

T

 Steven W. Taylor – Oklahoma Supreme Court justice
 Frank M. Tejeda – U.S. Congressman from Texas
 Jerald terHorst – press secretary (1974) for President Gerald Ford
 Craig Thomas – U.S. Senator from Wyoming (R)
 Jason Thomas – saved two police officers' lives on September 11 who were trapped in the rubble of the towers
 Bernard Trainor – author, journalist, NBC military analyst
 Lee Trevino – PGA Tour golfer and member of the World Golf Hall of Fame
 Bobby Troup – actor, singer, songwriter of (Get Your Kicks on) Route 66
 William M. Tuck – U.S. Congressman from Virginia, Governor of Virginia
 Gene Tunney – world boxing champion, Boxing Hall of Famer
 Martin Tytell – owner of the Tytell Typewriter Company who became known as "Mr. Typewriter, New York"

U
 Leon Uris – author (Exodus, Trinity)

V
 J.D. Vance – writer and venture capitalist known for his memoir Hillbilly Elegy
 Bill Veeck – baseball team owner, baseball Hall of Famer

W
 
 Ralph Waite – actor (The Waltons)
 Walter Walsh – FBI agent, award-winning shooter
 Joseph Wambaugh – bestselling American writer (The Onion Field)
 John Warner – former Secretary of the Navy, U.S. Senator from Virginia
 Charles Waterhouse – artist
 Mike Weaver – world boxing champion
 James E. Webb – second Administrator of NASA
 James H. "Jim" Webb – U.S. Senator (D – VA), former U.S. Secretary of the Navy, author
 Robert Webber – actor (12 Angry Men, The Dirty Dozen)
 Chuck Wepner – boxer, often named as the inspiration for the Rocky movie series
 Bing West – author, former Assistant Secretary of Defense in the Reagan Administration
 Jo Jo White – former NBA basketball player with the Boston Celtics
 Charles Whitman – University of Texas clocktower sniper
 James Whitmore – Oscar-nominated actor (Give 'em Hell, Harry!, The Shawshank Redemption)
 Larry Wilcox USMC 1967–70, Sgt, Vietnam, I Corps, actor, CHIPS TV Series, NBC, Producer, The Ray Bradbury Theater.
 Steve Wilkos – TV host, Chicago Police Department veteran
 Montel Williams – Emmy Award-winning talk show host who later served as a cryptology officer in the U.S. Navy; retired as a lieutenant commander after 22 years of service (The Montel Williams Show)
 Ted Williams – baseball Hall of Famer
 Jonathan Winters – comedian
 Pete Wilson – former Governor of California
 Ed Wood – director (Glen or Glenda and Plan 9 from Outer Space)
 Jeremiah Wright – controversial pastor of Trinity United Church of Christ in Chicago

Y
 Burt Young – Oscar-nominated actor, artist and former boxer (Rocky, Chinatown)

Z
 George D. Zamka – NASA astronaut
 Anthony Zinni – foreign policy analyst and television commentator
 Barry Zorthian – press officer for  years during the Vietnam War

See also

 List of historically notable United States Marines
 List of United States Marine Corps astronauts
 List of United States Marine Corps four-star generals
 List of Medal of Honor recipients

References

External links
 Famous Marines from HQMC
 Famous Marines
 Famous Marines list at USMC Hangout

 
 
Lists of American military personnel